Sundavi is a town of Puran tehsil, Shangla District in the North-West Frontier Province of Pakistan.
Babozai sub sections Ado khel, Musa Khel, tribe are living in this village.  Yusufzai Pashtun tribe. 

Cities and towns in Shangla District